Wu Jun (吴军; born May 1972) is a Chinese politician.

Wu Jun may also refer to:

 Wu Jun (victim) (吴军; born c. 1963–?), a survivor of a 2008 robbery-murder in Singapore